The Banque Belge pour l'Étranger (BBE, "Belgian Bank for Lands Abroad") was a Belgian bank that operated mainly in Asia. It was originally established in 1902 in Brussels as the Banque Sino-Belge ("Chinese-Belgian Bank"), by the Société Générale de Belgique at the request of King Leopold II of Belgium. Its Hong Kong operation, initiated in 1935, was later renamed the Belgian Bank in 1980, Générale de Banque belge pour l’Étranger in 1985, General Belgian Bank in 1992, and Fortis Bank Asia in 2000, before being sold in 2005 to ICBC (Asia), the Hong Kong subsidiary of Industrial and Commercial Bank of China.

History

The Banque Sino-Belge was created in 1902, as Belgium, like other foreign powers with presence in China, was entitled to payments from the Qing Dynasty empire under the Boxer Protocol.

The bank immediately opened a branch in Shanghai, followed by Tianjin in 1906, London in 1909, Beijing in 1911, Cairo in 1912, and Alexandria in 1914. In 1913, the bank's London subsidiary substantially developed its footprint by merging with the Anglo-Foreign Banking Company Ltd (est. 1872).

During World War I while Belgium was under German occupation, the bank was managed from its London office. It also opened a branch in the Netherlands, which had remained neutral, in Rotterdam in 1915. It became the principal bank of the Commission for Relief in Belgium. After the war's end, its network expanded considerably to Cologne (1919), New York, Paris and Bucharest (1920), Brăila, Hankou and Manchester (1922), and Constantinople (1924).

Much of that expansion was reversed from 1929 and 1935, as the economic context became less favorable. The branches in Romania and Turkey were sold, and the others were transformed into subsidiaries. In 1929, the Egyptian branches became the Banque Belge et Internationale en Egypte (BBIE, also known as Belginter). The Paris branch then became a French bank, the one in London became a British bank in 1934, and the Chinese branches became a Chinese bank in 1935.

In 1935, the BBE opened another subsidiary in Hong Kong, which became its only operation in China during the 1950s as the operations in Beijing, Tianjin and Shanghai were nationalized by the new Communist government. The BBE further developed its activity in Hong Kong, which at some point was the third-largest foreign branch network in the colony behind HSBC and Standard Chartered. In 1948, the Paris-based Banque Belge pour l'Etranger (France) was acquired by the Banque de l'Union Parisienne. In 1950, the New York subsidiary of the London-based Banque Belge pour l'Etranger (Overseas) was converted into a subsidiary, as a precautionary measure against a scenario of Soviet invasion of Europe, and renamed as the Belgian American Banking Corporation, which in 1968 would be merged with U.S. affiliates of other European banks to form the European-American Banking Corporation, and in 2001 was eventually acquired by Citibank. In 1960, the BBIE in Egypt was nationalized and renamed the Bank of Port Said, and eventually absorbed in 1971 by Banque Misr.

The BBE in Hong Kong has been the banker of the Catholic Diocese of Hong Kong and also one of the two banks in the region to provide equipment loans. In September 2003, Fortis announced that it would sell it to ICBC (Asia). The operations that were to be merged with ICBC (Asia) were again renamed "Belgian Bank" on May 1, 2004, pending a full merger with ICBC (Asia), which required approval by the Legislative Council of Hong Kong, and started using the ICBC logo. On October 10, 2005, the merger was completed successfully with all branches of Belgian Bank renamed as ICBC (Asia).

Banknotes

Like other foreign banks in China during the late Qing Empire, the Banque Sino-Belge issued paper currency in the concessions where it had established branch offices.

See also
 Deutsch-Asiatische Bank
 Franco-Chinese Bank
 Russo-Chinese Bank

References

Industrial and Commercial Bank of China
Banks of Belgium
Banks of Hong Kong
Defunct companies of Hong Kong
Banks disestablished in 1998
Banks established in 1935